The Sam Houston Zephyr was a named passenger train operated by the Burlington-Rock Island Railroad, a subsidiary of both the Chicago, Burlington and Quincy Railroad and the Chicago, Rock Island and Pacific Railroad. It was the first streamlined passenger train in Texas.

Inaugurated on October 1, 1936, the year of the Texas centennial celebrations, the streamlined train was named for Texas hero Sam Houston.  On its original schedule, the train ran from the Texas and Pacific station in Fort Worth to Union Station in Houston in exactly five hours, making only four intermediate stops in Dallas, Waxahachie, Corsicana, and Teague.

The train was designated number 3 southbound, and number 4 northbound.  Its chief competitor was the Sunbeam, operated by the Texas and New Orleans Railroad (a subsidiary of the Southern Pacific) on a parallel route between Dallas and Houston.

One of the original trainsets from the Twin Cities Zephyr, number 9901, was transferred to begin this new route. While under the management of the Rock Island, Zephyr 9901 power car was destroyed by fire on December 19, 1944.  The Rock Island did not maintain the train properly; the cause of the fire was oil residue which poor maintenance failed to remove.  Because equipment was needed to keep the busy line running, the Rock Island replaced its Texas Rocket with the new Twin Star Rocket in July 1945.

Like many other passenger trains that experienced declining revenues in the face of competition from automobiles and airplanes in the 1950s and 1960s, the Sam Houston Zephyr was discontinued in 1966.

References

External links
 
 Streamliner Schedules (timetable and consist of the 1950 Sam Houston Zephyr) 
 Ken's Weather and Railroad page (1956 photos and 1959 timetable of the Sam Houston Zephyr) 
 "Burlington-Rock Island Railroad," Handbook of Texas Online
 Dallas Railroad Museum, "A Brief History of Railroads in Dallas"
 Burlington Route Historical Society, "The Burlington Zephyrs" (includes map of the various Zephyr routes)

Passenger trains of the Chicago, Burlington and Quincy Railroad
Passenger trains of the Chicago, Rock Island and Pacific Railroad
Named passenger trains of the United States
Passenger rail transportation in Texas
Railway services introduced in 1936
Railway services discontinued in 1966
Sam Houston